Honaviyeh (also Romanized as Honavīyeh) is a village in Ali Jamal Rural District, in the Central District of Boshruyeh County, South Khorasan Province, Iran. At the 2006 census, its population was 54, in 21 families.

References 

Populated places in Boshruyeh County